Peter Coonan  (born 1984) is an Irish actor, known for his role as Fran Cooney in the RTÉ One series Love/Hate,
for which he won Best Actor in a Supporting Role – Television at the 11th Irish Film & Television Awards. In 2011, he played Dave 'Dots' Fennel in the Irish crime film Between the Canals.

Personal life
In May, 2014, Coonan's girlfriend, Kim O'Driscoll, gave birth to their baby girl, Beth, at the National Maternity Hospital, Dublin.

They became engaged in 2015.

In 2017, their daughter Katie was born.

Filmography

Film

Television

References

External links
 Interview from 2013 with College Times
 

1984 births
Irish male film actors
Irish male television actors
Living people
Male actors from Dublin (city)